The Edward Rutledge House, also known as the Carter-May House and now The Governor's House Inn, is a historic house at 117 Broad Street in Charleston, South Carolina. This 18th-century house was the home of Founding Father Edward Rutledge (1749–1800), a signer of the United States Declaration of Independence and later Governor of South Carolina. Despite many changes to the house, it retains its 18th-century core dating to about 1760, and was declared a National Historic Landmark in 1971.

Description and history
The Edward Rutledge House is located in historic Charleston, at the southwest corner of Broad and Orange Streets. It is a large Charleston double house, two stories in height, with a hip roof and clapboard siding. It is oriented as many Charleston houses are, with a two-story porch facing to the right side. The facade facing Broad Street has a gable at the center of the roof, which is fully pedimented and has modillions lining its outline. An entrance is located in the center of the main five bays, topped by a transom window and gabled pediment, and flanked by sidelight windows. The interior, which has undergone much alteration due to varied uses of the house, still retains some of its original features.

The house is most notable as the home of Edward Rutledge, a signer of the United States Declaration of Independence. Rutledge, a South Carolina native, was trained in England in the law, and had by the time of the American Revolution established a law practice in Charleston. He served in the First and Second Continental Congresses, and spent time during the American Revolutionary War as a prisoner of war, having been captured in the 1780 Siege of Charleston. He served as Governor of South Carolina from 1798 to his death in 1800.

The home is now a bed and breakfast. Images of the renovations can be seen on its website.

See also

 John Rutledge House, across the street
 List of National Historic Landmarks in South Carolina
 National Register of Historic Places listings in Charleston, South Carolina

References

External links
 Edward Rutledge House, Charleston County (117 Broad St., Charleston), at South Carolina Department of Archives and History

National Historic Landmarks in South Carolina
Houses on the National Register of Historic Places in South Carolina
Houses completed in 1787
National Register of Historic Places in Charleston, South Carolina
Houses in Charleston, South Carolina
1787 establishments in South Carolina
Historic district contributing properties in South Carolina
Governor of South Carolina
Homes of United States Founding Fathers